Cypress Avenue light rail station is an important public transport interchange in the Gold Coast suburb of Surfers Paradise. The station is part of the Gold Coast's G:link light rail system situated on the corner of Cypress Avenue and Surfers Paradise Boulevard. The G:link connects Broadbeach South with Helensvale railway station via the key activity centres of Surfers Paradise and Southport. Cypress Avenue also provides a bus connection to Nerang via the Nerang railway station.

Location 
Below is a map of the local area. The station can be identified by the grey marker.{
  "type": "FeatureCollection",
  "features": [
    {
      "type": "Feature",
      "properties": {},
      "geometry": {
        "type": "Point",
        "coordinates": [
          153.4292030341749,
          -27.996511149057405
        ]
      }
    }
  ]
}

Transport Links 
Below is a list of Transport connections available from the Cypress Avenue G:link light rail station.

External links 
 G:link

References 

G:link stations
Railway stations in Australia opened in 2014
Surfers Paradise, Queensland